Riflessi di me is the debut album by Italian singer Francesca Michielin, released on 2 October 2012 and produced by Andrea Rigonat. The album was preceded on 31 August 2012 by the single "Sola", written by Elisa Toffoli and Roberto Casalino. The album also include the track "Distratto", released as Michielin's winning single shortly after she placed first at the fifth series of Italian talent show X Factor and already included in the extended play with the same title.

Track listing

Chart performance

Weekly charts

References

2012 debut albums
Francesca Michielin albums
Sony Music Italy albums
Albums produced by Richard Stannard (songwriter)